The witch trials in Poland started later than in most of Europe, beginning in earnest in Poland until the second half of the 17th century, but also lasted longer than elsewhere. Despite being formally banned in 1776, the law was not evenly enforced for the next half a century even after the witch trials had ended or became a rarity in the rest of Europe. It is estimated that between 3,000 and 4,000 people have been executed for sorcery in Poland.

History

Early history
The first known witchcraft case in Poland is the one included in a heresy trial against Damian of Borków by Bishop Jakub von Płock (r. 1396–1425), but the exact date is unknown.  In 1476 a woman, Dorota of Zakrzew was sentenced to be burned for sorcery in Poznań but the verdict was repealed, and the first confirmed execution for witchcraft in Poland took place when a woman whose name is lost was executed in Waliszew in 1511.

Chronology
During the 16th century and the first half of the 17th century, 49 women and 19 men were condemned for witchcraft in Poland, mostly in the areas close to the Holy Roman Empire, particularly Poznań.  The biggest witchcraft persecution, however, did not reach Poland until the second half of the 17th-century, and the most intense period of witch hunt in Poland took place in the period between 1670 and 1730.  The witch hunt in Poland lasted to a later period than most other countries in Europe and continued during the entire 18th century, despite several law reforms to first limit and then ban them.

The witch trials
Witch trials in Poland could be conducted by three different authorities: by the secular city courts, by the clerical courts of the church, and in the private courts of the noble landlords' estates.  Initially, witch trials was reserved for the clerical courts in accordance with a law from 1543, but in the following century, secular city courts handled them as well.  On 17 July 1672, in accordance with a decree issued from Mikołaj Prażmowski (1663–1673) and archbishop Michał Radziejowski (1688–1705), local courts could manage witch trials only if they had been transformed to them by the church or a high court, and death sentenced were banned unless confirmed by a high court.  This law was issued after a local court in Kłodawa had burned a group of women after severe torture and a trial with dubious legality.  However, this law was commonly ignored, and local courts continued to arrest, trial and execute people for sorcery so much that the law had to be repeated without effect several times until 1713.   
The Central High Court interrupted witch trials in local courts and stopped executions on several occasions, such as in Łęczyca 1702 and Przemyśl 1756.  

The most intense period of the Polish witch hunt took place in a period in which Poland was pillaged and devastated by war, rebellions, famine and plague, and the public was in search of explanations for what was commonly viewed as an apocalyptic time for Poland.  The typical Polish witch trial was conducted in a rural village or a small town against a woman accused by her neighbors for having used magic to cause suffering and harm to humans, animals, property and entire villages in a period of some catastrophe.   The peasantry seldom included accusations about a Pact with Satan and participation in a Witches' Sabbath, but their accusation was transformed to this interpretation by the authorities by the Catholic church and local courts, in order to make the case fit the description of Christian demonology witchcraft handbooks.   In Poland, the majority of those executed for sorcery were women: of 116 executed in Wielkopolska and Kujawy between 1624 and 1700, only five were men.

An example of a rural trial which culminated in a conviction for witchcraft was the one in Kasina Wielka, in 1634.

The end

The Polish-Lithuanian Commonwealth was one of the first countries in which persecution for sorcery became illegal. In 1768, a law reform mandated that all witchcraft cases were to be transformed to the national high court, which was followed by the abolition of the torture and death penalty for witchcraft by the Sejm on 23 October 1776.   However, these laws were also commonly ignored by the local courts who continued to conduct witch trials, and the ban against witch trials could not be enforced in Poland.  A number of witch trials attracted attention in Poland during the second half of the 18th century when witch trials were formally banned. One trial that attracted attention was the one against Franciszka Gołębiewska of Gostyń in 1773, where the accused was tortured to death; in 1786 a combined witch- and murder trial took place in Ulanow, and in 1790, a married couple, Maciej and Katarzyna Beret, were put on trial in Schöffengericht von Nowy Wiśnicz accused by the Krzywda family for having enchanted their cows.  The likely last witch trial in independent Poland prior to the final partition was conducted toward two women in an unspecified village outside Poznan in 1793, who were accused of having caused illness on live stock by use of witchcraft.  

The final Partition of Poland in 1795 did not immediately stop the witch trials despite the fact that witch trials were banned also by Russia, Prussia and Austria, as the Polish local courts had ignored also the Polish ban against witch trials. There is little documentation preserved of the witch trials of the 1790s, but a witch trial is known to have taken place in Żaszków in Polish Ukraine (then Russian partition) as late as 1799.  Barbara Zdunk, who were executed in a part of Poland then belonging to Prussia in 1811, has been described as the last person executed for sorcery in Poland (in the German partition) and also have sometimes been referred to as the last person officially executed for sorcery in Europe. (That claim has been disputed, however, as witchcraft was not a criminal offense in Prussia at the time. The last person known to have died in Poland after accusations of sorcery was Krystyna Ceynowa, also in the German partition, who in 1836 has been lynched by locals; those guilty of lynching would be judged and imprisoned by the German authorities).

Number of victims and local characteristics 
Although older research, attributed to early research by Polish historian , initially suggested that over 40,000 women might have been executed in witch trials in Poland, modern research, including newer works by Baranowski, noted that those initial estimates have been widely exaggerated, and only between 3,000 and 4,000 people are estimated to have been executed for sorcery in Poland; 90% of them women. Approximately 50% of the accused were found guilty, a similar ratio to the rest of Europe. The witch trials in Poland, although lasting longer than in most of Europe, have been described as less intensive; the number of people executed for sorcery in Europe is estimated to be around 60,000. Unlike elsewhere in Europe, due to the privileges of Polish nobility, there are no recorded instances of a process and execution of a noble (outside of a legend of Walenty Potocki, which historians describe as a fictional story).

See also
 Witch trials in the early modern period
 List of people executed by Poland by burning

References 

1476 establishments in Poland
1836 disestablishments in Poland
Early Modern law
Early Modern politics
Legal history of Poland
Political history of Poland
Social history of Poland
Witch trials in Poland
16th century in Poland
17th century in Poland
18th century in Poland